Tom Poland (born February 4, 1949 in Augusta, Georgia), as Thomas Mitchell Poland to John Mitchell Poland and Ruth Walker Poland. Known as a writer of things southern. He graduated from Lincoln High School in Lincolnton, Georgia. He earned a Bachelor of Arts in journalism and a master's degree in education from the University of Georgia.  A frequent contributor to magazines, he has written approximately 1,200 features.

His novel, Forbidden Island ... An Island Called Sapelo, deals with themes of hope and destruction: man's alteration of the Earth and man's efforts to stave off the inevitable loss of family.

He was the 2011-2012 playwright for  Swamp Gravy, Georgia's official folk life drama. His play,  Solid Ground, presents the hardships, joys, and beauty of the farming life in south Georgia. Save The Last Dance For Me, a book on how the blues led to beach music and the shag phenomenon along the Carolina beaches, was published by the University of South Carolina Press in the summer of 2012. He contributed to State of the Heart, an anthology of writers who contributed essays about their favorite places in South Carolina, foreword by Pat Conroy, edited by Aida Rogers and published by the University of South Carolina Press.

Reflections of South Carolina, Vol. II was published by the University of South Carolina Press in 2014, with foreword by Mary Alice Monroe.  The History Press of Charleston published Classic Carolina Road Trips in 2014, and South Carolina Country Roads in April 2018. Georgialina, A Southland As We Knew It was published in November 2015 by the University of South Carolina Press. Arcadia Publishing published “The Last Sunday Drive” in November 2019. Carolina Bays: Wild, Mysterious, and Majestic Landforms was published by the University of South Carolina Press in 2020 

He lives in Columbia, South Carolina where he shared his writing approach for 19 years as an adjunct professor at the University of South Carolina's College of Mass Information and Library Studies. As a member of the South Carolina Humanities Speakers Bureau, he is often invited to give presentations on the state’s culture and history. In 2018, Governor Henry McMaster awarded Poland the Order of the Palmetto for his significant contributions in heralding the unique heritage of South Carolina.

References

External links
Tom Poland's Website
WIS-TV, "Talk of the Town: A Place Called Obscurity" June 14, 2018
South Carolina Public Radio, "USC Press Showcases a Variety of Authors, Subjects" December 25, 2017
Thomasville Times Enterprise, "Swamp Gravy Serving up 25 Years of Entertainment" October 3, 2017
South Carolina Public Radio, "USC Press Showcases a Variety of Authors, Subjects" February 21, 2017
Albany Herald, "Swamp Gravy Coming to Albany" May 1, 2016
Free Times, "Finding New Stories in Familiar Places" January 6, 2016 
The Augusta Chronicle, "By the Book: New book recalls Southern days gone by" December 26, 2015
Free Times, "Columbia, Then and Now" September 23, 2015
Kirkus Reviews, "A Southland as We Knew It" September 3, 2015
Rotary Club of Lake Murray-Irmo, "The Rotary Club of Lake Murray hosted author Tom Poland" July 29, 2015
WIS-10, "Midlands author shares South Carolina hidden gems in travel book" 2014
Columbia Metropolitan, "Art for the Coffee Table: Reflections of South Carolina" 2014
Aiken Standard, "‘Reflections of South Carolina:’ Book captures Palmetto state through photographs, text" November 8, 2014
Hub City Writers Project, "New Books by Tom Poland" September 18, 2014
Free Times, "Writer, Photographer Reflect on SC" June 11, 2014
Aiken Standard, "S.C. writers provide their 'State of the Heart'" September 28, 2013
New Georgia Encyclopedia, "Swamp Gravy" August 6, 2013
The Augusta Chronicle, "Ramblin’ Rhodes: Shag has strong footing in Augusta" July 2, 2013
Aiken Standard, "Book festival to feature local authors, book appraisal" May 16, 2013
Miller County Liberal, "Swamp Gravy Starts Friday with 'Live and Learn'" February 27, 2013
Aiken Standard, "‘Save the Last Dance for Me’ traces evolution of beach music, shag dance" September 8, 2012
Miller County Liberal, "Swamp Gravy Searches Out Solid Ground" March 7, 2012
What Jasper Said: The Word on Columbia Arts, "Tom Poland reflects on his play, Solid Ground" October 23, 2011

1949 births
Living people
University of Georgia alumni
People from Lincolnton, Georgia
Writers from Georgia (U.S. state)
Writers from Columbia, South Carolina
American male journalists